Castela emoryi, with the common names crucifixion thorn, Emory's crucifixion-thorn, and , is a shrub species in the genus Castela of the family Simaroubaceae.

Distribution
The plant is native to the Mojave Desert and Sonoran Deserts of North America.

It is found in southern California, Arizona, and Sonora state (México).

The species is dioecious and occurs in the moistest areas in the hottest, driest deserts within its range; it is considered poor in germination.

Description

Crucifixion thorn is mostly leafless,  its sharp branches are green and perform photosynthesis. Seeds are contained in clusters of fruit in groups of 5. The fruit is tan, green, red or brown in color, turning black with age. and may persist on the tree for several years.

It is ranked on the California Native Plant Society Inventory of Rare and Endangered Plants, as an endangered species within California, and more common elsewhere. It is threatened by solar energy development and military activities within its California range. The species is classified as "Salvage restricted" in Arizona.

Ecology
Castela emoryi is one of the few plants in its habitat that blooms in the mid-summer heat, and serves as an important source of resources for insects during that time. Its nectar is collected by ants, and pollination is performed by wasps and bees,  particularly bumblebees.

Uses
The Yavapai people traditionally used this as a medicinal plant, making a dermatological aid from its bud's sap.

Insecticide and fungicide
It contains quassinoids such as glaucarubolone glucoside which has antifeedant properties against termites such as Reticulitermes flavipes, or potential fungicidal activity for the control of grape downy mildew.

It also contains glaucarubol, a compound characteristic of the family, ellagic acid, betulin and (—)-syringaresinol.

References

External links

CalFlora Database: Castela emoryi (Cricifixion Thorn)
Jepson Flora Project treatment of Castela emoryi
UC Photos gallery —  Castela emoryi

Simaroubaceae
Flora of the California desert regions
Flora of Arizona
Flora of Sonora
Flora of the Sonoran Deserts
Natural history of the Colorado Desert
Natural history of the Mojave Desert
Plant toxin insecticides
Plants used in traditional Native American medicine
Plants described in 1968
Taxa named by Reid Venable Moran
Flora without expected TNC conservation status